The 7th Reserve Officers' Training Corps Brigade is an Army Reserve Officers' Training Corps brigade based in Fort Knox, Kentucky. It provides training support and oversight to all Army ROTC and Junior ROTC units in the states of Ohio, Indiana, Kentucky, Michigan, and Tennessee.

Organization
The brigade comprises several ROTC battalions throughout these states. However, each ROTC unit is generally smaller than a battalion, as each contains around 100 cadets on average. The brigade commands 13 such battalions located at universities throughout Ohio, and five more throughout Kentucky. Additionally, the brigade commands 214 Junior Reserve Officer Training Corps programs throughout the five states. These "battalions" are usually larger, on average comprising over 150 cadets each.

Battalions

Kentucky 
Cumberland College
Eastern Kentucky University
Northern Kentucky University
Thomas More College
Union College
University of Kentucky
University of Louisville
University of Pikeville
Western Kentucky University
Murray State University
Morehead State University

Indiana 
Ball State University
University of Notre Dame
Indiana University
Indiana University Purdue University Indianapolis
Purdue University
Indiana Wesleyan University
Rose–Hulman Institute of Technology

Michigan
Central Michigan University
Eastern Michigan University
Michigan State University
University of Michigan
Western Michigan University
Ferris State University
Northern Michigan University
Michigan Technological University

Ohio 
Baldwin-Wallace College
Bowling Green State University
Capital University
Case Western Reserve University
Cedarville University
Central State University
Cleveland State University
College of Mount St. Joseph
Columbus College of Art and Design
Columbus State Community College
DeVry University
Denison University
Franklin University
Heidelberg College
John Carroll University
Kent State University
Kenyon College
Lourdes College
Miami University
Mount Union College
Muskingum College
Notre Dame College
Oberlin College
Ohio Dominican University
Ohio Northern University
The Ohio State University
Ohio University
Ohio Wesleyan University
Otterbein College
Tiffin University
University of Akron
University of Cincinnati
University of Dayton
University of Findlay
University of Toledo
Ursuline College
Walsh University
Wilberforce University
Wittenberg University
Wright State University
Xavier University
Youngstown State University

References

ROTC 007
Reserve Officers' Training Corps